Fritziana fissilis is a species of frogs in the family Hemiphractidae. It is endemic to southeastern Brazil and known from the mountains of Espírito Santo, Rio de Janeiro, São Paulo, and Rio Grande do Sul states.

The natural habitat of Fritziana fissilis is forest at elevations of  asl. They are found sitting on vegetation few metres above the ground, mostly in bromeliads. Tadpoles are released into bromeliads.

Fritziana fissilis is a very common species. It can be locally threatened by habitat loss.

References

fissilis
Endemic fauna of Brazil
Amphibians of Brazil
Amphibians described in 1920
Taxa named by Alípio de Miranda-Ribeiro
Taxonomy articles created by Polbot